Cosmic Gate is a German DJ duo consisting of trance music producers Claus Terhoeven (born 1972) and Stefan Bossems (born 1967). Both hail from Krefeld, Germany.

On October 28, 2009, DJ Magazine announced the results of their annual Top 100 DJ Poll, with Ultra Records artist Cosmic Gate placed #19, 43 spots above the group's ranking the year before. For the 2010 DJ Magazine Top 100 DJ Poll, Cosmic Gate moved to #24.

Career
Cosmic Gate was formed in 1999 when Terhoeven (also known as Nic Chagall) and Bossems (also known as Bossi) decided to assemble a new project in the electronic music field.

Their first single was "The Drums", followed by "Exploration of Space", "Mental Atmosphere" and their "Somewhere over the Rainbow" remix using samples from the film The Wizard of Oz. However, Cosmic Gate did not become well known until their single "Fire Wire" was released in the UK in 2001.

Cosmic Gate have made many remixes for artists such as Tiësto ("Urban Train"), Ferry Corsten ("Punk"), Blank & Jones ("DFF"), Israel Kamakawiwo'ole ("Somewhere Over the Rainbow"), Svenson & Gielen ("Answer the Question") and Vanessa-Mae ("White Bird").

Over the past few years, Cosmic Gate's sound has developed and moved away from the harder edge trance through to their current, more subtle yet still driving energetic music style. Since their third studio album, Earth Mover, they started moving towards the Progressive Trance style.

In 2015, they collaborated with Armin van Buuren on the trance track "Embargo", which was featured on Van Buuren's studio album "Embrace". Two years later, they announced their seventh studio album titled "Materia", which was released on January 20, 2017.

In 2018, Nic & Bossi were nominated for a Grammy Award For Best Remixed Recording for their remix of Gabriel & Dresden feat. Sub Teal "Only Road" on the Anjunabeats Label. They were the first ever trance artists to be nominated in this category.

Touring
The pair have played over 1,000 gigs, typically performing between 100 and 130 nights a year. They have played at clubs such as Ministry of Sound, The Guvernment, and Privilege Ibiza. They have played alongside DJs such as Armin Van Buuren, Ferry Corsten, W&W and Hardwell.

Discography

Albums

Studio albums
 Rhythm & Drums (2001)
 No More Sleep (2002)
 Earth Mover (2006)
 Sign of the Times (2009)
 Wake Your Mind (2011)
 Start to Feel (2014)
 Materia Chapter.One (2017)
 Materia Chapter.Two (2017)
 20 Years [Forward Ever Backward Never] (2019)
 Mosaiik Chapter One (2021)

Compilation albums
 Back 2 the Future - The Classics from 1999-2003: Remixed (2011)

DJ mixes
 MaxiMal in the Mix Vol. 5 (with Tillmann Uhrmacher) (2001)
 Technics DJ Set Volume Three (with DJ Shog) (2001)
 Techno Club Vol. 14 - Talla 2XLC Welcomes Cosmic Gate (2001)
 3AM Rush (2002)
 Bitte Ein Beat! - Beat 3 (2002)
 Back 2 Back - In the Mix (2003)
 Back 2 Back Vol. 2 (2005)
 Hard NRG 7 (2005)
 Back 2 Back 3 (2007)
 Privilege - World Biggest Club: Ibiza (with Hardwell) (2009)
 Back 2 Back 4 (2010)
 A State of Trance 500 (2011)
 Trance Nation (2012)
 Wake Your Mind Sessions 001 (2015)
 Wake Your Mind Sessions 002 (2016)
 Wake Your Mind Sessions 003 (2018)
 Trance Energy 2018 (2018)
 Wake Your Mind Sessions 004'' (2020)

Singles

Other Song
2016: Armin van Buuren & Cosmic Gate - "Embargo"

Remixes
 Sash! - Adelante (Cosmic Gate Remix) 1999
 U96 - Das Boot 2001 (Cosmic Gate Remix) 1999
 Green Court - Follow Me (Cosmic Gate Remix) 1999
 Green Court - Follow Me (Cosmic Gate Edit) 1999
 Miss Shiva - Dreams (Cosmic Gate Remix) 1999
 Beam vs. Cyrus and The Joker - Launch In Progress (Cosmic Gate Remix) 1999
 Bossi - To The Sky (Cosmic Gate Remix) 1999
 Taucher - Science Fiction (Cosmic Gate Remix) 2000
 Der Verfall - Der Mussolini (Cosmic Gate Remix) 2000
 E Nomine - E Nomine (Cosmic Gate Remix) 2000
 Aquagen - Lovemachine (Cosmic Gate Remix) 2000
 Balloon - Monstersound (Cosmic Gate Mix) 2000
 Beam and Yanou - Sound Of Love (Cosmic Gate Remix) 2000
 Talla 2XLC - World In My Eyes (Cosmic Gate Remix) 2001
 Blank & Jones - DJs, Fans & Freaks (Cosmic Gate Remix) 2001
 Safri Duo - Samb-Adagio (Cosmic Gate Remix) 2001
 Vanessa-Mae - White Bird (Cosmic Gate Remix) 2001
 Green Court - Inside Your Gates (Cosmic Gate Remix) 2001
 Tiësto - Urban Train (Cosmic Gate Remix) 2001
 Ferry Corsten - Punk (Cosmic Gate Remix) 2002
 Rank 1 - Awakening (Cosmic Gate Remix) 2002
 4 Strings - Diving (Cosmic Gate Remix) 2002
 DuMonde - God Music (Cosmic Gate Remix) 2002
 Sioux - Pho (Cosmic Gate Remix) 2002
 Svenson & Gielen - Answer the Question (Cosmic Gate Remix) 2002
 Age of Love - The Age of Love (Cosmic Gate Remix) 2004
 Beam - Amun (Cosmic Gate Mix) 2004
 C.Y.B - Now (Cosmic Gate Remix) 2005
 64 Bit - Virtual Discotech 1.0 (Cosmic Gate Remix) 2005
 Cosmic Gate - Race Car Driver (Back 2 Back Mix) 2005
 Cosmic Gate - The Drums (Back 2 Back Mix) 2005
 Armin van Buuren and Rank 1 - This World Is Watching Me (Cosmic Gate Remix) 2007
 Kirsty Hawkshaw Meets Tenishia - Outsiders (Cosmic Gate Remix) 2007
 Tiësto featuring JES - Everything (Cosmic Gate Remix) 2007
 Cosmic Gate - Body Conflict (Cosmic Gate Club Mix) 2007
 Vincent De Moor - Fly Away (Cosmic Gate Remix) 2007
 Messler - Prepare (Cosmic Gate B2B3 Edit) 2007
 Cosmic Gate - Fire Wire (Cosmic Gate B2B3 Reconstruction) 2007
 Veracocha - Carte Blanche (Cosmic Gate Remix) 2008
 OceanLab - Sirens of the Sea (Cosmic Gate Remix) 2008
 Deadmau5 - Clockwork (Cosmic Gate Remix) 2008
 Armin van Buuren featuring Cathy Burton - Rain (Cosmic Gate Remix) 2009
 John O'Callaghan featuring Sarah Howells - Find Yourself (Cosmic Gate Remix) 2009
 Fabio XB and Ronnie Play featuring Gabriel Cage - Inside Of You (Cosmic Gate Remix) 2009
 Paul van Dyk featuring John McDaid - Home (Cosmic Gate Remix) 2009
 Markus Schulz presents Dakota - Sin City (Cosmic Gate Remix) 2009
 Kyau & Albert - I Love You (Cosmic Gate Remix) 2009
 JES - Lovesong (Cosmic Gate Remix) 2009
 Cosmic Gate - London Rain (Back 2 Back 4 ReDub)
 James Horner and Leona Lewis - I See You [ Avatar Main Theme ] (Cosmic Gate Remix) 2010
 Andrew Bennett featuring Sir Adrian - Run Till U Shine (Cosmic Gate Remix) 2010
 Cosmic Gate - Exploration of Space (Cosmic Gate's Back 2 The Future Remix) 2010
 Cosmic Gate - Fire Wire (Cosmic Gate's Back 2 The Future Remix) 2010
 Markus Schulz - Away (Cosmic Gate Remix) 2011
 Robbie Rivera - Departures (Cosmic Gate Remix) 2011
 Ferry Corsten - Punk (Cosmic Gate Essential Rework) 2011
 Emma Hewitt - Colours (Cosmic Gate Remix) 2012
 Rank 1 and Jochen Miller featuring Sarah Bettens - Wild and Perfect Day (Cosmic Gate Remix) 2012
 Manufactured Superstars – Calling All The Lovers (Cosmic Gate Remix) 2012
 Late Night Alumni - Sapphire (Cosmic Gate Remix) 2012
 Veracocha - Carte Blanche (Cosmic Gate Remix) 2013
 Armin van Buuren - Pulsar (Cosmic Gate Remix) 2013
 Gareth Emery - Long Way Home (Cosmic Gate Remix) 2015
 Cosmic Gate - Exploration of Space (Cosmic Gate's Third Contact Remix) 2016
 Gabriel & Dresden featuring Sub Teal - Only Road (Cosmic Gate Remix) 2018
 Gareth Emery featuring Evan Henzi - Call To Arms (Cosmic Gate Remix) 2018
 Ilan Bluestone - Frozen Ground (Cosmic Gate Remix) 2018
 Mauro Picotto - Lizard (Cosmic Gate Remix) 2019
 Rank 1 - L.E.D. There Be Light (Cosmic Gate Remix) 2019
 Armin van Buuren and Avian Grays featuring Jordan Shaw - Something Real (Cosmic Gate Remix) (2020)
 Joe Smooth - Promised Land (Cosmic Gate's No Gravity Remix) (2020)
 Andrew Rayel and Olivia Sebastianelli - Everything Everything (Cosmic Gate Remix) (2020)

Awards and nominations

2018 Grammy nomination 'Best Remixed Recording, Non-classical' for 'Only Road' by Gabriel & Dresden.

DJ Magazine

Top 100 DJs Ranking

References

External links

 Official site
 TranceSound interview with Cosmic Gate, December 2010
 Cosmic Gate ranks #39 on ''DJ Magazine'''s Top 100 DJs list 2012
 Start To Feel tour interview
 Cosmic Gate ranks #69 on ''DJ Mag'''s Top 100 DJs list 2014

German DJs
German electronic music groups
German dance music groups
German trance music groups
German musical duos
Remixers
Black Hole Recordings artists
Electronic dance music DJs
Electronic dance music duos
Musical groups established in 1999